George Henry Parsons (June 28, 1914 – June 30, 1998) was a Canadian professional ice hockey left winger who played 64 games with the Toronto Maple Leafs. Parsons suffered a career-ending eye injury in 1939, forcing him to retire from the National Hockey League. Parsons later became involved with CCM hockey and the development of hockey helmets and facial protection. The George Parsons Trophy is given annually to the player judged to be the most sportsmanlike at the Memorial Cup tournament.

Playing career
Parsons played four seasons of junior ice hockey from 1930 to 1934, and appeared in the 1933 Memorial Cup as a member of the West Toronto Nationals, and the 1934 Memorial Cup as a member of the Toronto Young Rangers. While still a junior in 1932, he was also used as a call-up to senior hockey teams in the Toronto Mercantile Hockey League, and the Toronto Independent Hockey League. Parsons participated in the 1935 Allan Cup with the Toronto All-Stars.

Parsons signed as a free agent with the Maple Leafs on October 22, 1935. Parsons played the 1935–36 season with the International Hockey League's Syracuse Stars, then made his NHL debut playing five games with the Leafs in the 1936–37 NHL season. He finished the season as a member of the Syracuse Stars who won the inaugural Calder Cup in the 1936–37 AHL season. He began the next season with Syracuse, then moved up to the Leafs.

An on-ice accident at Maple Leaf Gardens against the Chicago Black Hawks resulted in Parsons losing his left eye."I remember the date well. It was March 3rd, 1939. I was 24 years old. Earl Robinson of Chicago tried to lift my stick but he hit me in the eye. When I was in the hospital the president of the league, Frank Calder, visited me and suggested that I shouldn't play again."— George Parsons

Parsons was forced to retire from the NHL due to a rule prohibiting players with reduced sight. The league had previously adopted the Trushinski Bylaw by-law which forbade players with one eye to play. It was named after a minor leagueplayer named Frank Trushinski, who had lost sight in one eye, and then lost most of the sight in his other eye.

CCM hockey
Parsons became involved with CCM hockey, helping to develop helmets and facial protection that would be safer for players. Within CCM, he was the North American sales manager to vice-president of product development. By early 1976, CCM had developed a hockey helmet complete with eye and face shield and lower face protector that was both approved by the Canadian Standards Association and endorsed by the Canadian Amateur Hockey Association.

Career statistics

Regular season and playoffs

References

External links

1914 births
1998 deaths
Businesspeople from Toronto
Canadian ice hockey left wingers
Canadian sports businesspeople
Ice hockey people from Toronto
Ontario Hockey Association Senior A League (1890–1979) players
Syracuse Stars (AHL) players
Syracuse Stars (IHL) players
Toronto Maple Leafs players
Toronto Young Rangers players